The qualification process of men's teams for the 2001 Rugby World Cup Sevens. Automatic qualification was extended to the host and the eight quarterfinalists of the previous World Cup. The remaining spots were contested in each of the five regions' respective tournaments.

Qualified teams

Africa
Africa had two tournaments as a qualifier. First on 29 April was a preliminary round-robin tournament in Abidjan where Ivory Coast and Tunisia finished the highest. They then joined ten other teams in Nairobi for a 23–24 June tournament. Kenya and Zimbabwe both advance as finalists of the tournament.

Qualifier 1 (Abidjan)
{| class="wikitable" style="text-align: center;"
|-
!width="120"|Teams
!width="40"|Pld
!width="40"|W
!width="40"|D
!width="40"|L
!width="40"|PF
!width="40"|PA
!width="40"|+/–
!width="40"|Pts
|-bgcolor=ccffcc
|align=left|
|3||3||0||0||66||22||+44||9
|-bgcolor=ccffcc
|align=left|
|3||2||0||1||36||17||+19||7
|-
|align=left|
|3||1||0||2||52||26||+26||5
|-
|align=left|
|3||0||0||3||12||101||–89||3
|}

Qualifier 2 (Nairobi)

Day 1
Pool A
{| class="wikitable" style="text-align: center;"
|-
!width="120"|Teams
!width="40"|Pld
!width="40"|W
!width="40"|D
!width="40"|L
!width="40"|PF
!width="40"|PA
!width="40"|+/–
!width="40"|Pts
|-
|align=left|
|3||2||0||1||69||26||+43||7
|-
|align=left|
|3||2||0||1||68||31||+37||7
|-
|align=left|
|3||2||0||1||50||26||+24||7
|-
|align=left|
|3||0||0||3||0||104||–104||3
|}

Pool B
{| class="wikitable" style="text-align: center;"
|-
!width="120"|Teams
!width="40"|Pld
!width="40"|W
!width="40"|D
!width="40"|L
!width="40"|PF
!width="40"|PA
!width="40"|+/–
!width="40"|Pts
|-
|align=left|
|3||3||0||0||94||5||+89||9
|-
|align=left|
|3||2||0||1||62||21||+41||7
|-
|align=left|
|3||1||0||2||17||68||–51||5
|-
|align=left|
|3||0||0||3||12||91||–79||3
|}

Pool C
{| class="wikitable" style="text-align: center;"
|-
!width="120"|Teams
!width="40"|Pld
!width="40"|W
!width="40"|D
!width="40"|L
!width="40"|PF
!width="40"|PA
!width="40"|+/–
!width="40"|Pts
|-
|align=left|
|3||2||1||0||108||28||+89||8
|-
|align=left|
|3||2||0||1||94||31||+63||7
|-
|align=left|
|3||1||1||1||56||47||+9||6
|-
|align=left|
|3||0||0||3||12||164||–152||3
|}

Day 2
Pool A
{| class="wikitable" style="text-align: center;"
|-
!width="120"|Teams
!width="40"|Pld
!width="40"|W
!width="40"|D
!width="40"|L
!width="40"|PF
!width="40"|PA
!width="40"|+/–
!width="40"|Pts
|-bgcolor=ccffcc
|align=left|
|2||2||0||0||80||5||+75||6
|-
|align=left|
|2||1||0||1||26||55||–29||4
|-
|align=left|
|2||0||0||2||15||61||–46||2
|}

Pool B
{| class="wikitable" style="text-align: center;"
|-
!width="120"|Teams
!width="40"|Pld
!width="40"|W
!width="40"|D
!width="40"|L
!width="40"|PF
!width="40"|PA
!width="40"|+/–
!width="40"|Pts
|-bgcolor=ccffcc
|align=left|
|2||2||0||0||73||7||+66||6
|-
|align=left|
|2||1||0||1||73||17||+56||4
|-
|align=left|
|2||0||0||2||0||122||–122||2
|}

Pool C
{| class="wikitable" style="text-align: center;"
|-
!width="120"|Teams
!width="40"|Pld
!width="40"|W
!width="40"|D
!width="40"|L
!width="40"|PF
!width="40"|PA
!width="40"|+/–
!width="40"|Pts
|-bgcolor=ccffcc
|align=left|
|2||2||0||0||43||5||+38||6
|-
|align=left|
|2||1||0||1||14||12||+2||4
|-
|align=left|
|2||0||0||2||10||50||–40||2
|}

Pool D
{| class="wikitable" style="text-align: center;"
|-
!width="120"|Teams
!width="40"|Pld
!width="40"|W
!width="40"|D
!width="40"|L
!width="40"|PF
!width="40"|PA
!width="40"|+/–
!width="40"|Pts
|-bgcolor=ccffcc
|align=left|
|2||2||0||0||54||12||+42||6
|-
|align=left|
|2||1||0||1||26||45||–19||4
|-
|align=left|
|2||0||0||2||24||47||–23||2
|}

Knockout Round

Americas
The Americas had two tournaments to serve as a qualifier. First was a 22–23 January tournament in Port of Spain for the Caribbean zone, from which Trinidad and Tobago emerged victorious. It then joins another nine teams in a deciding inter-Americas tournament in Santiago for three spots on 6-7 May.

Qualifier 1 (Port of Spain)
Pool A
{| class="wikitable" style="text-align: center;"
|-
!width="160"|Teams
!width="40"|Pld
!width="40"|W
!width="40"|D
!width="40"|L
!width="40"|PF
!width="40"|PA
!width="40"|+/–
!width="40"|Pts
|-
|align=left|
|3||3||0||0||90||17||+73||9
|-
|align=left|
|3||2||0||1||55||24||+31||7
|-
|align=left|
|3||1||0||2||41||41||+0||5
|-
|align=left|
|3||0||0||3||10||114||–104||3
|}

Pool B
{| class="wikitable" style="text-align: center;"
|-
!width="160"|Teams
!width="40"|Pld
!width="40"|W
!width="40"|D
!width="40"|L
!width="40"|PF
!width="40"|PA
!width="40"|+/–
!width="40"|Pts
|-
|align=left|
|3||2||0||1||66||38||+28||7
|-
|align=left|
|3||2||0||1||53||38||+15||7
|-
|align=left|
|3||1||0||2||41||60||–19||5
|-
|align=left|
|3||1||0||2||31||55||–24||5
|}

Knockout Round

Qualifier 2 (Santiago)
Pool A
{| class="wikitable" style="text-align: center;"
|-
!width="160"|Teams
!width="40"|Pld
!width="40"|W
!width="40"|D
!width="40"|L
!width="40"|PF
!width="40"|PA
!width="40"|+/–
!width="40"|Pts
|-bgcolor=ccccff
|align=left|
|4||4||0||0||167||5||+162||12
|-bgcolor=ccccff
|align=left|
|4||3||0||1||135||33||+102||10
|-bgcolor=ccccff
|align=left|
|4||2||0||2||61||82||–21||8
|-bgcolor=ccccff
|align=left|
|4||1||0||3||33||144||–111||6
|-
|align=left|
|4||0||0||4||12||144||–132||4
|}

Pool B
{| class="wikitable" style="text-align: center;"
|-
!width="160"|Teams
!width="40"|Pld
!width="40"|W
!width="40"|D
!width="40"|L
!width="40"|PF
!width="40"|PA
!width="40"|+/–
!width="40"|Pts
|-bgcolor=ccccff
|align=left|
|4||4||0||0||120||19||+101||12
|-bgcolor=ccccff
|align=left|
|4||3||0||1||141||17||+124||10
|-bgcolor=ccccff
|align=left|
|4||2||0||2||64||124||–60||8
|-bgcolor=ccccff
|align=left|
|4||1||0||3||29||102||–73||6
|-
|align=left|
|4||0||0||4||28||120||–92||4
|}

Knockout Round

Asia
A two-day tournament was held in Kuala Lumpur to determine the three teams to join South Korea at the World Cup Sevens.

Day One
Pool A
{| class="wikitable" style="text-align: center;"
|-
!width="120"|Teams
!width="40"|Pld
!width="40"|W
!width="40"|D
!width="40"|L
!width="40"|PF
!width="40"|PA
!width="40"|+/–
!width="40"|Pts
|-
|align=left|
|4||4||0||0||183||43||+140||12
|-
|align=left|
|4||2||0||2||130||85||+45||8
|-
|align=left|
|4||2||0||2||116||74||+42||8
|-
|align=left|
|4||2||0||2||88||101||–13||8
|-
|align=left|
|4||0||0||4||12||226||–214||4
|}

Pool B
{| class="wikitable" style="text-align: center;"
|-
!width="120"|Teams
!width="40"|Pld
!width="40"|W
!width="40"|D
!width="40"|L
!width="40"|PF
!width="40"|PA
!width="40"|+/–
!width="40"|Pts
|-
|align=left|
|4||4||0||0||91||33||+58||12
|-
|align=left|
|4||2||0||2||69||53||+16||8
|-
|align=left|
|4||2||0||2||78||69||+9||8
|-
|align=left|
|4||1||0||3||62||93||–31||6
|-
|align=left| Arabian Gulf
|4||1||0||3||46||98||–52||6
|}

Day Two
Pool C
{| class="wikitable" style="text-align: center;"
|-
!width="120"|Teams
!width="40"|Pld
!width="40"|W
!width="40"|D
!width="40"|L
!width="40"|PF
!width="40"|PA
!width="40"|+/–
!width="40"|Pts
|-bgcolor=ccffcc
|align=left|
|4||4||0||0||192||45||+147||12
|-bgcolor=ccccff
|align=left|
|4||3||0||1||148||57||+91||10
|-
|align=left|
|4||2||0||2||59||106||–47||8
|-
|align=left|
|4||1||0||3||54||96||–42||6
|-
|align=left|
|4||0||0||4||21||170||–149||4
|}

Pool D
{| class="wikitable" style="text-align: center;"
|-
!width="120"|Teams
!width="40"|Pld
!width="40"|W
!width="40"|D
!width="40"|L
!width="40"|PF
!width="40"|PA
!width="40"|+/–
!width="40"|Pts
|-bgcolor=ccffcc
|align=left|
|4||4||0||0||143||47||+96||12
|-bgcolor=ccccff
|align=left|
|4||3||0||1||81||63||+18||10
|-
|align=left| Arabian Gulf
|4||1||0||3||76||90||–14||6
|-
|align=left|
|4||1||0||3||44||81||–37||6
|-
|align=left|
|4||1||0||3||38||101||–63||6
|}

Placement Round

Europe
There were two separate tournaments in Europe, both qualifying three nations among sixteen. The first took place in Heidelberg on 10–11 June. The second in Madrid took place between 30 June and 1 July.

Qualifier 1 (Heidelberg)

Day 1
Pool A
{| class="wikitable" style="text-align: center;"
|-
!width="140"|Teams
!width="40"|Pld
!width="40"|W
!width="40"|D
!width="40"|L
!width="40"|PF
!width="40"|PA
!width="40"|+/–
!width="40"|Pts
|-
|align=left|
|3||3||0||0||131||7||+124||9
|-
|align=left|
|3||2||0||1||48||39||+9||7
|-
|align=left|
|3||1||0||2||34||55||–21||5
|-
|align=left|
|3||0||0||3||0||112||–112||3
|}

Pool B
{| class="wikitable" style="text-align: center;"
|-
!width="140"|Teams
!width="40"|Pld
!width="40"|W
!width="40"|D
!width="40"|L
!width="40"|PF
!width="40"|PA
!width="40"|+/–
!width="40"|Pts
|-
|align=left|
|3||3||0||0||106||7||+99||9
|-
|align=left|
|3||2||0||1||68||54||+14||7
|-
|align=left|
|3||1||0||2||49||64||–15||5
|-
|align=left|
|3||0||0||3||17||115||–98||3
|}

Pool C
{| class="wikitable" style="text-align: center;"
|-
!width="140"|Teams
!width="40"|Pld
!width="40"|W
!width="40"|D
!width="40"|L
!width="40"|PF
!width="40"|PA
!width="40"|+/–
!width="40"|Pts
|-
|align=left|
|3||3||0||0||99||26||+73||9
|-
|align=left|
|3||2||0||1||69||45||+24||7
|-
|align=left|
|3||1||0||2||55||53||+2||5
|-
|align=left|
|3||0||0||3||5||104||–99||3
|}

Pool D
{| class="wikitable" style="text-align: center;"
|-
!width="140"|Teams
!width="40"|Pld
!width="40"|W
!width="40"|D
!width="40"|L
!width="40"|PF
!width="40"|PA
!width="40"|+/–
!width="40"|Pts
|-
|align=left|
|3||3||0||0||136||0||+136||9
|-
|align=left|
|3||2||0||1||47||46||+1||5
|-
|align=left|
|3||1||0||2||22||71||–49||5
|-
|align=left|
|3||0||0||3||7||95||–88||3
|}

Day 2
Pool A
{| class="wikitable" style="text-align: center;"
|-
!width="140"|Teams
!width="40"|Pld
!width="40"|W
!width="40"|D
!width="40"|L
!width="40"|PF
!width="40"|PA
!width="40"|+/–
!width="40"|Pts
|-bgcolor=ccffcc
|align=left|
|3||3||0||0||124||12||+112||9
|-
|align=left|
|3||2||0||1||52||52||+0||7
|-
|align=left|
|3||1||0||2||19||53||–34||5
|-
|align=left|
|3||0||0||3||12||90||–78||3
|}

Pool B
{| class="wikitable" style="text-align: center;"
|-
!width="140"|Teams
!width="40"|Pld
!width="40"|W
!width="40"|D
!width="40"|L
!width="40"|PF
!width="40"|PA
!width="40"|+/–
!width="40"|Pts
|-bgcolor=ccffcc
|align=left|
|3||3||0||0||130||12||+118||9
|-
|align=left|
|3||2||0||1||56||64||–8||7
|-
|align=left|
|3||1||0||2||50||66||–16||5
|-
|align=left|
|3||0||0||3||17||111||–94||3
|}

Pool C
{| class="wikitable" style="text-align: center;"
|-
!width="140"|Teams
!width="40"|Pld
!width="40"|W
!width="40"|D
!width="40"|L
!width="40"|PF
!width="40"|PA
!width="40"|+/–
!width="40"|Pts
|-bgcolor=ccffcc
|align=left|
|3||3||0||0||64||19||+45||7
|-
|align=left|
|3||2||0||1||50||38||+12||7
|-
|align=left|
|3||1||0||2||50||46||+4||7
|-
|align=left|
|3||0||0||3||19||80||–61||3
|}

Pool D
{| class="wikitable" style="text-align: center;"
|-
!width="140"|Teams
!width="40"|Pld
!width="40"|W
!width="40"|D
!width="40"|L
!width="40"|PF
!width="40"|PA
!width="40"|+/–
!width="40"|Pts
|-bgcolor=ccffcc
|align=left|
|3||3||0||0||106||22||+84||9
|-
|align=left|
|3||2||0||1||90||48||+42||7
|-
|align=left|
|3||1||0||2||33||99||–66||5
|-
|align=left|
|3||0||0||3||32||92||–60||3
|}

Qualifier 2 (Madrid)

Day 1
Pool A
{| class="wikitable" style="text-align: center;"
|-
!width="120"|Teams
!width="40"|Pld
!width="40"|W
!width="40"|D
!width="40"|L
!width="40"|PF
!width="40"|PA
!width="40"|+/–
!width="40"|Pts
|-
|align=left|
|3||3||0||0||162||14||+148||9
|-
|align=left|
|3||2||0||1||55||66||–11||7
|-
|align=left|
|3||1||0||2||38||66||–28||5
|-
|align=left|
|3||0||0||3||12||121||–109||3
|}

Pool B
{| class="wikitable" style="text-align: center;"
|-
!width="120"|Teams
!width="40"|Pld
!width="40"|W
!width="40"|D
!width="40"|L
!width="40"|PF
!width="40"|PA
!width="40"|+/–
!width="40"|Pts
|-
|align=left|
|3||3||0||0||158||0||+158||9
|-
|align=left|
|3||2||0||1||68||47||+21||7
|-
|align=left|
|3||1||0||2||54||74||–20||5
|-
|align=left|
|3||0||0||3||0||159||–159||3
|}

Pool C
{| class="wikitable" style="text-align: center;"
|-
!width="120"|Teams
!width="40"|Pld
!width="40"|W
!width="40"|D
!width="40"|L
!width="40"|PF
!width="40"|PA
!width="40"|+/–
!width="40"|Pts
|-
|align=left|
|3||3||0||0||111||17||+94||9
|-
|align=left|
|3||2||0||1||87||43||+44||7
|-
|align=left|
|3||1||0||2||32||66||–34||5
|-
|align=left|
|3||0||0||3||7||111||–104||3
|}

Pool D
{| class="wikitable" style="text-align: center;"
|-
!width="120"|Teams
!width="40"|Pld
!width="40"|W
!width="40"|D
!width="40"|L
!width="40"|PF
!width="40"|PA
!width="40"|+/–
!width="40"|Pts
|-
|align=left|
|3||3||0||0||116||19||+97||9
|-
|align=left|
|3||2||0||1||119||38||+81||7
|-
|align=left|
|3||1||0||2||36||113||–77||5
|-
|align=left|
|3||0||0||3||38||139||–101||3
|}

Day 2
Pool A
{| class="wikitable" style="text-align: center;"
|-
!width="120"|Teams
!width="40"|Pld
!width="40"|W
!width="40"|D
!width="40"|L
!width="40"|PF
!width="40"|PA
!width="40"|+/–
!width="40"|Pts
|-bgcolor=ccffcc
|align=left|
|3||3||0||0||109||5||+104||9
|-
|align=left|
|3||2||0||1||52||67||–15||7
|-
|align=left|
|3||1||0||2||43||71||–28||5
|-
|align=left|
|3||0||0||1||34||95||–61||3
|}

Pool B
{| class="wikitable" style="text-align: center;"
|-
!width="120"|Teams
!width="40"|Pld
!width="40"|W
!width="40"|D
!width="40"|L
!width="40"|PF
!width="40"|PA
!width="40"|+/–
!width="40"|Pts
|-bgcolor=ccffcc
|align=left|
|3||3||0||0||111||12||+99||9
|-
|align=left|
|3||2||0||1||78||50||+28||7
|-
|align=left|
|3||1||0||2||26||96||–70||5
|-
|align=left|
|3||0||0||3||35||92||–57||3
|}

Pool C
{| class="wikitable" style="text-align: center;"
|-
!width="120"|Teams
!width="40"|Pld
!width="40"|W
!width="40"|D
!width="40"|L
!width="40"|PF
!width="40"|PA
!width="40"|+/–
!width="40"|Pts
|-bgcolor=ccffcc
|align=left|
|3||3||0||0||88||14||+74||9
|-
|align=left|
|3||2||0||1||73||12||+61||7
|-
|align=left|
|3||1||0||2||54||45||–70||5
|-
|align=left|
|3||0||0||3||0||144||–144||3
|}

Pool D
{| class="wikitable" style="text-align: center;"
|-
!width="120"|Teams
!width="40"|Pld
!width="40"|W
!width="40"|D
!width="40"|L
!width="40"|PF
!width="40"|PA
!width="40"|+/–
!width="40"|Pts
|-bgcolor=ccffcc
|align=left|
|3||3||0||0||135||14||+121||9
|-
|align=left|
|3||2||0||1||105||29||+76||7
|-
|align=left|
|3||0||1||2||24||111||–87||4
|-
|align=left|
|3||0||1||2||19||129||–110||4
|}

Oceania
The Oceania qualifying tournament took place in Rarotonga. After a six-team round robin, the two leading teams faced off for the championship, from which the host won and qualified for the World Cup.

{| class="wikitable" style="text-align: center;"
|-
!width="160"|Teams
!width="40"|Pld
!width="40"|W
!width="40"|D
!width="40"|L
!width="40"|PF
!width="40"|PA
!width="40"|+/–
!width="40"|Pts
|-bgcolor=ccffcc
|align=left|
|5||4||1||0||134||22||+112||14
|-bgcolor=ccffcc
|align=left|
|5||4||0||1||131||43||+88||13
|-
|align=left|
|5||3||1||1||92||70||+22||12
|-
|align=left|
|5||2||0||3||73||82||–9||9
|-
|align=left|
|5||1||0||4||63||99||–36||7
|-
|align=left|
|5||0||0||5||17||194||–177||5
|}

References

Rugby World Cup Sevens qualification
World Cup Qualifier Sevens